The Le Pen family is a prominent political family of France. Le Pen is a Breton surname meaning "the head", "the chief" or "the peninsula". The family has led the National Rally party (formerly the National Front) since its inception in 1972, first under Jean-Marie Le Pen (1972–2011) and subsequently under his daughter Marine Le Pen.

History

Jean-Marie Le Pen

Family tree

Marine Le Pen

Family tree

Marion Maréchal

Family tree

Marie-Caroline Le Pen

Family tree

Members

 Jean-Marie Le Pen (1928): Leader of the National Front (1972-2011), Candidate for the French presidential elections (1974, 1988, 1995, 2002 and 2007), Member of the European Parliament (1984-2019), Regional Councillor of Île-de-France (1986–1992), Regional Councillor of Provence-Alpes-Côte d'Azur (1992–2015), Leader of the Comités Jeanne (2016-since), Leader of the Blue, White and Red Rally (2015-since), Honorary President of the National Front (2011-since), Member of the National Assembly (1956-1962), City councillor for the 20th arrondissement of Paris (1983)
 Pierrette Le Pen (1935), former spouse of Jean-Marie Le Pen (1960-1987): Candidate for the French municipal elections (2014)
 Marine Le Pen (1968), third daughter of Jean-Marie Le Pen: Member of the European Parliament (2004-since), Leader of the National Front (2011-since), Candidate for the French presidential elections (2012 and 2017)
 Louis Aliot (1969), partner of Marine Le Pen (since 2009): Vice President of the National Front (2011-since), Regional councillor of Midi-Pyrénées (1998–2010), Municipal councillor of Perpignan (2008-2009, 2014-since), Regional councillor of Languedoc-Roussillon (2010-2015), Member of the European Parliament (2014-2017), Member of the National Assembly (2017-since), Candidate for the French cantonal election (2011), Candidate for the European Parliament election (2009)
 Lorrain de Saint Affrique (1952), partner of Marine Le Pen (1984): communications manager (1984-1994), Regional councillor of Languedoc-Roussillon (1992-1998, defector in 1994), General Secretary of the Comités Jeanne (2016-since)
 Samuel Maréchal (1967), spouse of Yann Le Pen (1993-2007): campaign manager (1991), director of the youth wing (1992-1999), Regional councillor of Loire (1998-2010)
 Marion Maréchal (1989), granddaughter of Jean-Marie Le Pen, daughter of Yann Le Pen and Samuel Maréchal (adopted): Member of the French National Assembly (2012–2017), Regional councillor of Provence-Alpes-Côte d'Azur (2015-2020, resigned in 2017)
 Roger Auque (1956-2014), partner of Yann Le Pen: Municipal councillor of Paris (2008-2009), Ambassador to Eritrea (2009-2012)
 Philippe Olivier (1961), spouse of Marie Caroline Le Pen: Regional Councillor of Île-de-France (1992–2004), Candidate for the French legislative elections (1993, 1997 and 2017), Candidate for the French municipal elections (2011)
 Marie-Caroline Le Pen (1960), daughter of Jean-Marie Le Pen: Regional Councillor of Île-de-France (1992–2004), Former member of the Central Committee of the National Front, Candidate for the French legislative elections (1997), Candidate for the French regional elections (1998), married to MEP Philippe Olivier

Photos

See also
 Politics of France

References

 
Political families of France
Christian families